Woodrow Wilson Middle School, formerly Woodrow Wilson Junior High School, is a historic school building located at Terre Haute, Vigo County, Indiana.  It was built in 1927 for approximately $750,000. Designed by the firm of Miller & Yeager Architects.   It is a three-story, "T"-plan, Tudor Revival style brick building with central entrance tower.

The structure was listed on the National Register of Historic Places in 1996.

The interior of the school's main entrance features several large-scale murals by Gilbert Brown Wilson, completed in 1935.

References

External links
 Woodrow Wilson MS

School buildings on the National Register of Historic Places in Indiana
Tudor Revival architecture in Indiana
School buildings completed in 1927
Public middle schools in Indiana
Buildings and structures in Terre Haute, Indiana
National Register of Historic Places in Terre Haute, Indiana
1927 establishments in Indiana